Squillace is a town and commune in southern Italy.

Squillace may also refer to:

Gulf of Squillace, an inlet of the Ionian Sea off the coast of Italy
Diocese of Squillace, a former diocese, now part of the Roman Catholic Archdiocese of Catanzaro-Squillace

See also
Gioffre Borgia (1482–1522), Prince of Squillace, youngest son of Pope Alexander VI, brother of Lucrezia and Cesare Borgia
Anne of Savoy (1455–1480), Princess of Squillace, Altamura, and Taranto
Leopoldo de Gregorio, Marquis of Esquilache, originally Squillace (1741–1785)
Jean de Montfort-Castres (died 1300), Count of Squillace